William L. Grayson Stadium is a stadium in Savannah, Georgia. It is primarily used for baseball, and is the home field of the Savannah Bananas of the Coastal Plain League collegiate summer baseball league.  It was the part-time home of the Savannah State University college baseball team from 2009 to 2011. It was also used from 1927 until 1959 for the annual Thanksgiving Day game between Savannah High School and Benedictine Military School. Known as "Historic Grayson Stadium" it was built in 1926. It holds 4,000 people. It also served as the home of the Savannah Cardinals from 1984 to 1995 and the Savannah Sand Gnats from 1996 to 2015.

History
Originally known as Municipal Stadium, it first served as the home field of the minor league Savannah Indians. In 1932, it hosted the Boston Red Sox for spring training. The park underwent major renovations in 1941, following a devastating hurricane in 1940. Spanish–American War veteran General William L. Grayson led the effort to get the $150,000 needed to rebuild the stadium. Half of the funds came from the Works Progress Administration (WPA). In recognition of Grayson's work, the stadium was renamed in his honor.

The first integrated South Atlantic League game took place at Grayson Stadium on April 14, 1953.

The park went through a two-year renovation process that started prior to the 2007 season.

Grayson Stadium was the venue for the 2017 GHSA Baseball Championships for Class 1A Private, Class 2A, Class 3A, and Class 5A. It was also used for the 2018 and 2019 GHSA Baseball Championships.

Timeline

References

External links
 The Savannah Bananas
 Ball Park Reviews: Grayson Stadium
 Stadium Journey: Grayson Stadium

Minor league baseball venues
Baseball venues in Georgia (U.S. state)
Works Progress Administration in Georgia (U.S. state)
Savannah State Tigers baseball
Negro league baseball venues still standing
1926 establishments in Georgia (U.S. state)
Sports venues completed in 1926
College baseball venues in the United States
Boston Red Sox spring training venues